Molchad (Meytshet) is a village located on the Molchad River in the Baranovichy District of the Brest Region, Belarus. It is located in 33 km north-west from Baranovichi.  The population of Molchad is 950 people and includes 330 households.

History
The village of Molchad has appeared in written sources as early as 1486 with the founding of the local Holy Trinity Church, which no longer stands, it was listed as part of the Slonim povet of the Grand Duchy of Lithuania.
During the Russo-Polish War in 1654 the village was razed by Russian invaders but latter rebuilt.

Under the Russian Empire
As a result of the third partition of Poland in 1795 Molchad became part of the Russian Empire. 
In 1879, the village suffered a large fire which destroyed most of the buildings in Molchad. 
In 1880, the St. Peter and Paul Church was completed.
In 1884 a railway was built through the village connecting it to the nearby city of Brest.
In 1886 Molchad was reported to have 2 churches, 3 synagogues, a brewery, a railway station , a school and a bazaar.

20th Century
In 1921, the Peace of Riga transferred Molchad to Poland.
Following the Invasion of Poland in 1939, Molchad was incorporated into the Byelorussian SSR. 
Between June 1941 and July 1944, Molchad was occupied by Nazi Germany, From June through August 1942, 3600 Jews from Molchad and the surrounding area were massacred by the native Polish population with the support of German troops. Many Jews were buried alive.

Historic Populations
In 1830, the population was 363 people: 183 were Jewish, 169 were middle class Christians and farmers, 6 were gentry, 2 clergy and 3 poor. 
In 1865, the population was 737.
In 1886, the population was 479.
In 1921, the population was 1483.
In 1998, the population was 882.

References

Molchadz (Maytchet), In Memory of the Jewish Community (Molchad, Belarus)

Villages in Belarus
Populated places in Brest Region
Nowogródek Voivodeship (1507–1795)
Slonimsky Uyezd
Nowogródek Voivodeship (1919–1939)
Jewish Belarusian history
Holocaust locations in Belarus